Herbert Fisher may refer to:

 H. A. L. Fisher (1865–1940), English historian, educator and politician
 Herbert William Fisher (1826–1903), British historian, father of H. A. L. Fisher
 Herbert O. Fisher (1909–1990), American test pilot and aviation executive
 Herbert Fisher (businessman), American businessman